Red blood may refer to:

 Hematology:
 Hemoglobin, an iron-based metalloprotein compound and system for transporting oxygen, found in the blood all vertebrates
 Red blood cell
 Red blood cell indices
 Red blood python (Python curtus brongersmai)

See also 
 
 Blood red, a shade of colour
 Americanism (disambiguation)